Tamera "Ty" Young (born October 30, 1986) is a former American basketball player who is currently a free agent. After playing collegiately for James Madison University, Young was drafted by the Atlanta Dream with the 8th overall pick of the 2008 WNBA Draft. She was traded to the Chicago Sky, and led them to the WNBA Finals in 2015, then came back to Atlanta, and was traded to the Aces in 2018.

Personal 
Born in Wilmington, North Carolina, Tamera Young is the daughter of the late Greg Young and Lynda Nichols-Brown and John Brown. She has an older brother, A.J., and an older sister, Nikia. Her cousin, Willie Williams, was a cornerback for the National Football League's Pittsburgh Steelers and a 13-year NFL veteran (Steelers 1993–96, 2005; Seattle Seahawks 1997–2003). Tamera is the all-time leading scorer at Emsley A. Laney High School, the same high school that produced Michael Jordan, where her number 11 jersey is retired. During her senior year she led the "Buccaneers to the 2004 Conference Championship. During her off-seasons she spends her time with her fiancée, Mimi Faust in Atlanta raising awareness about pancreatic cancer to which she lost her father on April 6, 2015.

College career 
Tamera played collegiately at James Madison University in the Colonial Athletic Association. She set numerous records while in college, including the conference's all-time scoring record. As a senior, she led JMU to the third round of the 2008 WNIT, before ultimately losing to the University of Kentucky.

James Madison statistics 

Source

WNBA career 
Young was drafted in the first round with the eighth overall pick in the 2008 WNBA draft by the expansion team Atlanta Dream. In her first season with the Dream Tamera became the first player from James Madison University to play in the WNBA and wore the number 23 on her jersey. In her second season she switched to the number 11, which she wore in college. While playing for the Atlanta Dream, Young's per game averages included 8.9 points, 5.5 rebounds, 1.8 assists, 1.2 steals, and 27.4 minutes a game.

On August 12, 2009, Young was traded to the Chicago Sky in exchange for Armintie Price.

As a player, she averaged 40.5% in field goal accuracy, 27% in three-point accuracy, and averaged 6.8 PPG.

On February 1, 2018, Young signed a contract with the Las Vegas Aces.

Overseas career 
During the 2008–2009 off-season, following her rookie year in the WNBA, Young went to Latvia and played for Cesis. For the 2009–2010 off-Season Young went to Turkey and played for Pankup. In 2010, she signed with Basket Landes in France for the 2010–2011 off-Season. Young signed to play for Istanbul University in Turkey for the 2011–2012 off-season. After the winter holidays she would sign with Maccabi Bnot Ashdod in Israel and go on to win the 2012 Israeli Cup and be named the MVP.

In the 2014 off-season, Young joined the Brazilian championship, being teammate to various Atlanta Dream players in América de Recife.

References 

1986 births
Living people
American expatriate basketball people in Brazil
American expatriate basketball people in China
American expatriate basketball people in France
American expatriate basketball people in Israel
American expatriate basketball people in Latvia
American expatriate basketball people in Turkey
American women's basketball players
Atlanta Dream draft picks
Atlanta Dream players
Basketball players from North Carolina
Chicago Sky players
James Madison Dukes women's basketball players
Las Vegas Aces players
Shanxi Flame players
Small forwards
Sportspeople from Wilmington, North Carolina